Van Blerk is a Dutch noble surname. Notable people with the surname include:

Johannes van Blerk, Dutch soldier, on June 24, 1743 in the service of the Dutch East India Company.
Jan Barend van Blerk, Dutch ship gunner (Dutch: busschieter), on October 20, 1772 in the service of the Dutch East India Company.
Nicolaas van Blerk, (1825-1899). In 1864 Nico van Blerk started a forge and iron shop on the Smidspad. Since around 1900, tabernacles, safes and mainly safes have been manufactured here. In 1935 Van Blerk started producing steel office furniture. In the early 1960s, the company grew at the seams and started building a new industrial factory. In 1975 Van Blerk merged with Asmeta, Assendelft, after which the name Assenburg was created. In 2010, Royal Ahrend, an international leader in commercial furniture, integrated the production activities. In 1964 the company N. van Blerk donated a work of art to the municipality of Tilburg on the occasion of its 100th anniversary. The statue Seated girl (Zittend Meisje) by the Eindhoven artist Hans Goddefroy was placed at the Stadsschouwburg .
Gérard van Blerk (born 1924), Dutch pianist. He was born in Tilburg where he gave his first concerts as a child . Van Blerk is known both as a chamber music player and as an accompanist. As a soloist he performed with all the important symphony orchestras in The Netherlands. He also was a principal subject teacher of piano at the Royal Conservatory in The Hague.
Hendrik van Blerk (born 1915), South African journalist and writer.
Cliff van Blerk (born 1938), Australian soccer player
Jason van Blerk (born 1968), Australian soccer player

References

Afrikaans-language surnames
Surnames of Dutch origin